GMK Ltd is in the business of brand representation and distribution in the UK shooting sports market, and provides a full importation business including; sales, warehousing, marketing, credit collection and after sales service. It is the leading UK importer of shotguns, rifles and rifle ammunition and also distributes other shooting related products. Many of the brands it represents are market leaders in the UK.

GMK Ltd (previously Gunmark until January 1998) is a privately owned enterprise which commenced trading in 1971 and has been continuously owned and managed by the Waktare family. Founded by Bjorn Waktare, he was then joined by his sons, Karl and Oskar, in 1994 and 1996, respectively. They now head the company following Bjorn’s retirement in 1998.

In 2005, Beretta, the major supplier to GMK bought 20% of the company. In March 2013, Beretta increased their share of the business to 60%. The remaining 40% continues to be owned by the Waktare family.

History 
Bjorn Waktare moved from Sweden to the UK and founded Gunmark,  in 1971. The company exclusively imported and distributed foreign goods.

In 1977 Gunmark was appointed Beretta distributor for the UK and quickly developed Beretta into one of two leading shotgun brands in the UK market. 

The company worked hard to diversify their business and introduced many new products on to the UK market. In 1989 they became distributors for the luxury rubber boot brand Le Chameau, which grew to become their second largest brand after Beretta. Le Chameau was purchased by Lafuma Group SA in the early 1990s.

In the mid 1990s a new UK Sales Manager was appointed for Le Chameau, to spearhead the move into non-shooting country-wear stores. It was this move which prompted the change of name from Gunmark Ltd to GMK Ltd.

Having recruited his two sons into the business, Waktare moved to the South of France in 1998, making Karl Waktare managing director at the age of 31 and Oskar Waktare, finance director at 28.

In 2000, GMK became the distributor for Franchi shotguns, followed a year later by their appointment as distributor for Tikka rifles from Finland. In that same year they won the UK distribution rights from US ammunition giant ATK (brands including Federal, CCI and RCBS), and began importing their products in to the UK. The storage of this ammunition coupled with generic growth forced GMK to look for new premises and in 2002 they moved into a new, purpose built building. Also in 2002 GMK moved the distribution of Le Chameau into a joint venture with Lafuma called LLC Ltd.

Having begun supplying to UK police forces, GMK’s presence in the Law Enforcement market steadily increased. In 2004 they applied for ISO 9001 certification which was later awarded.

In 2005 The Beretta Gallery was opened, on the corner of St James Street and Jermyn Street, London. A joint venture between Beretta and GMK Ltd, this flagship store sells both ladies and gentlemen’s luxury shooting clothing and related goods. The top floor of the Beretta Gallery houses the largest gun room in London, exhibiting the entire range of Beretta shotguns.

The company continued to show strong growth right up until the 2008 financial crisis, where problems with exchange rates created difficulties for GMK Ltd. However, troubles in the domestic markets were offset by strong growth in their tactical sales.

In 2008 GMK supplied the British MOD with Benelli M4 shotguns, for use by the British Army as an urgent operational requirement. In 2013 GMK won its biggest tender to date, to supply the British MOD with Steiner military 8 x 30 R binoculars. This was a multimillion pound contract, initially for five years but with options to extend.

Although sales were obviously affected by the financial crisis of 2007-08 and the subsequent recession, GMK took the opportunity to re-evaluate certain areas of the business, emerging stronger and recovering very quickly.
At the end of 2013 GMK completed a major project to install solar panels on the roof of the building. The system generates large amounts of electricity, even on overcast days, and feeds excess electricity back into the National Grid. This produces an income for GMK but more importantly contributes to the reduction of carbon emissions in the UK. In 2019 GMK installed electric car charging stations.

External links

The Parliamentary Review : Best Practice Sponsor : GMK Article

1971 establishments in the United Kingdom
Business services companies established in 1971
Shooting sports in the United Kingdom
Beretta
Retail companies established in 1971